Alexander van Geen (7 December 1903 – 27 February 1942) was a Dutch modern pentathlete. He competed at the 1936 Summer Olympics. During World War II he served in the Royal Netherlands Navy, and was killed during the Battle of the Java Sea.

References

External links
 

1903 births
1942 deaths
Dutch male modern pentathletes
Olympic modern pentathletes of the Netherlands
Modern pentathletes at the 1936 Summer Olympics
Sportspeople from The Hague
Dutch military personnel killed in World War II
Royal Netherlands Navy officers
Royal Netherlands Navy personnel of World War II
20th-century Dutch people